Welcome to Discovery Park is the third studio album by the alternative rock band Brad. It was released in 2002 on Redline Records.

Overview
The album's recording sessions took place from May 2001 to March 2002 at Studio Litho and Studio X in Seattle, Washington. Studio Litho is owned by guitarist Stone Gossard. The recording of Welcome to Discovery Park saw contributions from Mike Berg, who had taken over as the touring bassist for Jeremy Toback. Most of the album was produced by the band members themselves, although they also worked with producers Phil Nicolo and Skip Drinkwater. The album was mixed by Nicolo, Drinkwater, and Matt Bayles. The album's cover art was photographed by Bruce Tom. The album mixes the rawness of the band's debut, Shame, with the more polished, produced sound of the band's second album, Interiors. The album charted at number 46 on Billboard'''s Top Heatseekers chart. Bradley Torreano of Allmusic called it "another quality album that still leaves the listener hungry overall for some better songs." Outtakes from the recording sessions for Welcome to Discovery Park were included on the 2005 compilation album, Brad vs Satchel''.

Track listing

European bonus tracks

Personnel

Brad
Mike Berg – keyboards, piano, bass guitar, guitars, synth, organ
Stone Gossard – guitars, drums, organ, synth, bass guitar
Regan Hagar – drums, synth, guitar, design and layout
Shawn Smith – vocals, piano, guitars, programming, drums, synth, bass guitar, organ
Jeremy Toback – bass guitar

Additional musicians and production
Matt Bayles – engineering, recording, mixing
Brad – production
Skip Drinkwater – additional production, mixing
Rick Fisher at RFI/CD Mastering (Seattle) – mastering
Sam Hofstedt, Floyd Reitsma – assistance
Phil Nicolo – additional production, engineering, mixing
Elizabeth Pupo Walker – percussion
Bruce Tom – photos
Thaddeus Turner – guitars, bass guitar

Chart positions

References

2002 albums
Brad (band) albums
Albums produced by Stone Gossard